This is a list of cricketers who have played matches for the Pakistan Television cricket team.

 Mohammad Abbas
 Zohaib Ahmed
 Mohammad Ali
 Usman Ashraf
 Hammadullah Khan
 Mohammad Hasnain
 Ali Imran
 Mohammad Irfan
 Aamer Jamal
 Azam Khan
 Tabish Khan
 Umair Khan
 Athar Mahmood
 Abdul Majid
 Waleed Malik
 Nihal Mansoor
 Adnan Mehmood
 Hasan Mohsin
 Hasan Raza
 Usman Saeed
 Saud Shakeel
 Mohammad Waqas

References 

Lists of Pakistani cricketers